The Kent County League is a football competition based in Kent, England. The league has seven senior divisions – a Premier Division, Division One East and West, Division Two East and West and Division Three East and West. It sits below the Southern Counties East League Division One (step 6 of the National League System) since the 2016–17 season. Previously it fed the Kent Invicta League from the Invicta League's formation in 2011 to its merger with the Southern Counties East League in 2016.

As of the 2022–23 season, there are 16 clubs in the Premier Division. The bottom two clubs faced relegation to the regional lower divisions. Clubs from a number of smaller district leagues may be eligible to gain promotion to the County League. These feeder leagues are the Ashford and District League, Bromley and South London Football League, Canterbury & District League, Rochester & District League and Sevenoaks & District League.

Member clubs 2022–23

Premier Division
Borden Village
Bromleians
Chipstead
Fleetdown United
Halls
Hawkinge Town
Ide Hill
Kings Hill
Minster
New Romney
Otford United
Peckham Town
Red Velvet
Stansfeld O&BC
Ten-Em-Bee
Tenterden Town

Division One East and Central
Ashford

Cuxton 91
Greenway Aces 
Guru Nanak
Hollands & Blair Reserves 
K Sports Reserves
Rochester City
Rusthall Reserves
Snodland Town Reserves
Sturry 

Whitstable Town Reserves
Woodnesborough

Division One West
Belverdere
Bexley
Bridon Ropes Reserves
Club Langley
Crayford Arrows
Crockenhill
Danson Sports
Equinoccial 

Long Lane
Metrogas
South East Athletic
Sporting Club Thamesmead Reserves

Welling Park

Division Two Central & East 
AFC Rangers
Aylesford
Cinque Ports
Cuxton Reserves
Deal Town Reserves
Lydd Town Reserves
Minster Reserves
Sittingbourne Reserves
Tenterton Town Reserves
Tankerton

Division Two West
Bexley Reserves
Bromleians Reserves
Dulwich Village
Farnborough Old Boys Guild
Falconwood
Fleetdown United Reserves
FC Greenwich
Orpington
Parkwood Rangers
Stansfeld O&BC Reserves

Division Three Central & East
Baypoint
Charing
Chilham
Cinque Ports Reserves
Gillingham Town
Kings Hill Reserves
Larkfield & New Hythe Reserves
Lenham Wanderers
Lokomotiv Canterbury
New Romney Reserves
Paddock Wood
Sellindge

Division Three West
AMG Ballerz
ALL Starz
Dartford Celtic

Halls AFC Reserves
Ide Hill Reserves
AFC Lewisham
Long Lane Reserves
Metrogas Reserves
Otford United Reserves

Honours list
Divisional champions have been as follows:

1951–92 Western section

1969–92 Eastern Section

1992–present

Major restructuring combined the regional Senior Divisions into one Premier Division. Divisions below were renamed.

References

External links
 Kent County Football League Official Website

 
Football leagues in England
3